The 2016 Philadelphia Eagles season was the franchise's 84th season in the National Football League and the first under head coach Doug Pederson. The Eagles named 2nd overall pick Carson Wentz the starting  quarterback for Week 1 against the Cleveland Browns. The Eagles started 3–0 including a 34–3 win over their intrastate rivals, the Pittsburgh Steelers. Following their Week 4 bye week, the Eagles went 4–9, including a 2–4 record against their divisional rivals. Following a 27–26 loss to the Baltimore Ravens in Week 15, the Eagles were eliminated from playoff contention for the third consecutive season and fourth time in five seasons. This was the last season the Eagles missed the playoffs until 2020.

Roster changes

Free agents

Free agent signings

Trades
 On March 9, the Eagles traded cornerback Byron Maxwell, linebacker Kiko Alonso, and the 13th overall pick in the 2016 NFL Draft to the Miami Dolphins for the 8th overall draft pick.
 On March 9, the Eagles traded running back DeMarco Murray and their 4th round draft pick to the Tennessee Titans for their 4th round draft pick.
 On March 11, the Eagles traded quarterback Mark Sanchez to the Denver Broncos for a conditional 7th round pick in 2017 NFL Draft— predicated upon Sanchez making the Broncos'  Week 1 roster.
 On April 20, the Eagles traded their 2016 1st, 3rd, and 4th round picks, along with their 2017 1st round pick and their 2018 2nd round pick to the Cleveland Browns for the 2nd overall pick the 2016 NFL Draft.
 On August 16, the Eagles traded offensive tackle Dennis Kelly to the Tennessee Titans for wide receiver Dorial Green-Beckham.
 On September 4, The Eagles traded Sam Bradford to the Minnesota Vikings for their 2017 1st round pick and their 2018 conditional 4th round pick.
 On September 7, The Eagles traded Eric Rowe to the New England Patriots for their 2018 conditional 4th round pick.

Roster changes
The Eagles cut wide receiver Riley Cooper on February 8, 2016. They later cut veteran linebacker DeMeco Ryans on February 24, 2016.

Draft

Notes
 The Eagles traded their second-round selection, along with a 2015 fourth-round selection and quarterback Nick Foles to the St. Louis Rams in exchange for the Rams' 2015 fifth-round selection and quarterback Sam Bradford.
 The Eagles acquired an additional third-round selection in a trade that sent their 2015 fourth-round selection to the Detroit Lions.
 The Eagles conditionally acquired an additional fifth-round selection in a trade that sent cornerback Brandon Boykin to the Pittsburgh Steelers; the condition could have upgraded to a fourth-rounder if Boykin played at least 60% of the snaps with the Steelers during the 2015 season, but he did not.
 The Eagles conditionally acquired an additional seventh-round selection in a trade that sent quarterback Matt Barkley to the Arizona Cardinals; the Eagles were to only receive this selection if Barkley was on the Cardinals' 2015 roster for at least six games, which was fulfilled on October 17, 2015.

Undrafted free agents

Staff

Final roster

Schedule

Preseason

Regular season

Note: Intra-division opponents are in bold text.

Game summaries

Week 1: vs. Cleveland Browns
The Eagles kicked off the 2016 season against the Cleveland Browns. 2nd Overall pick Carson Wentz made his debut. The Eagles started off well. Wentz threw his 1st career TD to Jordan Matthews. Caleb Sturgis missed a field goal in the 1st Quarter but did made one early in the 2nd Quarter to extend the lead to 10–0. The Browns would respond early in the 2nd quarter with an Isaiah Crowell 1 yard TD to cut the Eagles lead to 10–7. The Eagles only managed to kick another Sturgis field goal in the 2nd Quarter which resulted in a 13–7 lead at halftime. The Browns then kicked another field goal to change the score to 13–10. Midway through the 3rd Quarter, a bad snap by Browns center Cameron Erving went over the head of Quarterback Robert Griffin III and into the end zone for a safety and it extended the Eagles lead to 15–10. Following that drive, Wentz and the offense went back to work. Wentz threw his 2nd TD to Nelson Agholor to change the score to 22–10. The Eagles mainly burned out the clock in the 4th quarter to weaken the Browns hopes of a comeback. Ryan Mathews sealed the game with a 1-yard TD to make the final score 29–10.

With the win, the Eagles opened the season 1–0.

Week 2: at Chicago Bears
Following their big win at home, the Eagles trailed to Illinois to square off Jay Cutler and the Bears in Soldier Field. The Bears scored a touchdown early in the 2nd Quarter by Jeremy Langford. The Eagles only got away with 3 field goals throughout the first half, leading 9–7 at the half. However, things turned around in the 2nd half. Cutler fumbled early in the 3rd quarter, setting up a Ryan Mathews 3-yard touchdown to increase the Eagles lead to 16–7. On the Bears' next drive, Cutler threw an interception to Linebacker Nigel Bradham to set up a touchdown from Carson Wentz to tight end Trey Burton to increase their lead to 22–7. (Kicker Caleb Sturgis missed the extra point.) Cutler left the game with a thumb injury. Backup Brian Hoyer came to relieve him. Early in the 4th quarter, Jeremy Langford fumbled, giving the Eagles the ball at the Bears 47-yard line. The Eagles mainly burned out the clock throughout the 4th quarter. Mathews ran for another touchdown to extend their lead to 29–7. Eddie Royal returned a punt for a touchdown with 5 minutes to go in the 4th quarter. However, the Eagles pulled away the game to end their chances.

With the win, the Eagles moved to 2–0 and tied the New York Giants for first place in the NFC East.

Week 3: vs. Pittsburgh Steelers
The Eagles returned home to face their long time state rivals, the Pittsburgh Steelers. The Eagles blocked a Chris Boswell field goal to deny 3 points. The Eagles drew first blood with a Caleb Strugis field goal to make the score 3–0. Early in the 2nd quarter, Rookie Quarterback Carson Wentz threw a 12-yard touchdown to Jordan Matthews to add to their lead. The Steelers finally got on board with a Chris Boswell field goal which turned out to be the only scoring play for the Steelers. Strugis notched another field goal to extend their lead to 13–3 at the half. Then, early in the 2nd Half, Wentz threw a 73-yard touchdown to running back Darren Sproles to extend their lead to 20–3. After a Steelers 3 and out, rookie running back Wendell Smallwood scored his first career rushing touchdown and it extend to Eagles lead to 27–3. On the Steelers next drive, veteran quarterback Ben Roethlisberger fumbled the football which the Eagles recovered. The Eagles would score a Kenjon Barner rushing touchdown to create a stunning 31 point lead. The Eagles defense shut down the Steelers offense. Roethlisberger threw an interception to Rodney McLeod late in the game as the Eagles pulled away a huge 34–3 win.

With the win, The Eagles headed into their bye week with a commanding 3–0 record and 1st place in NFC East. (The Giants lost to the Redskins earlier in the day.)

Week 5: at Detroit Lions

Week 6: at Washington Redskins

Week 7: vs. Minnesota Vikings
This was the Eagles first blackout game of the year.

Week 8: at Dallas Cowboys

Week 9: at New York Giants

After a heartbreaking overtime loss in Dallas, the Eagles traveled to MetLife Stadium to take on the Giants. The Eagles started off slow. Wentz threw 2 interceptions and the defense allowed 2 touchdowns by Eli Manning to Odell Beckham Jr and to Roger Lewis. The Eagles defense struggled all day especially Leodis McKelvin until the 4th quarter when the Eagles intercepted Manning twice. But, they weren't able to comeback as the Eagles failed to score a touchdown. The loss dropped the Eagles to 4–4 and 4th place in the NFC East. After this loss, the Eagles would not lose to New York again until Week 10 of 2020 (November 15, 2020), after 8 consecutive wins.

Week 10: vs. Atlanta Falcons

The Eagles, with the win, stay alive in the NFC East and the wild card race as they take down the NFC South leaders and the NFL's best offense.

Week 11: at Seattle Seahawks

Week 12: vs. Green Bay Packers

Week 13: at Cincinnati Bengals
With the loss, the Eagles fell to 5–7. They also fell to 0-4-1 all time in Cincinnati.

Week 14: vs. Washington Redskins

Week 15: at Baltimore Ravens

The loss knocked the Eagles out of playoff contention for the third consecutive year. Despite a rushing touchdown by Carson Wentz in the final seconds, they failed the 2-point conversion; sealing a fifth straight loss and a playoff elimination.

Week 16: vs. New York Giants
After a heartbreaking loss that knocked the Eagles out of the playoffs, they came back home to square off the New York Giants for round 2. Prior to this game, the Eagles were 0–4 against division rivals. Playing with pride, the Eagles knocked off the Giants including a pick 6 by Malcolm Jenkins. With the win, the Eagles snapped their 5-game losing streak and won against the Giants at home for the 3rd consecutive season. The win allowed the Cowboys to clinch the NFC East. This started an 8-game winning streak for the Eagles against the Giants, ending Week 10 of 2020.

Week 17: vs. Dallas Cowboys
With the win, the Eagles finished the year at 7–9. Furthermore, they won their first game against the Cowboys at Lincoln Financial Field since 2011.

Standings

Division

Conference

References

External links
 

Philadelphia
Philadelphia Eagles seasons
Philadelphia Eagles